Santosh Nagar Colony, or Santoshnagar Colony, is a residential and commercial area in Hyderabad, India. It is located near Saidabad in the Old City of Hyderabad and DRDO laboratories. It is divided into two areas, the Old Santoshnagar Colony and New Santoshnagar Colony. Santoshnagar falls under the Yakutpura assembly constituency, which is represented by All India Majlis-e-Ittehadul Muslimeen Legislator Syed Ahmed Pasha Quadri

Commercial area
Shops in Santoshnagar include supermarkets such as MORE, Big Bazaar, Fresh@ on the main road. The nearest market for wholesale vegetables and groceries is Madannapet Mandi, 2 km away in Saidabad.

Yadagiri is a popular cinema. Venkateshwara and Kankadurga are the most popular temples, and Masjid e Baghdadia, Masjid e Sahaba and the recently established Masjid e Nusrath are the most popular Masjid in Santoshnagar.

There are bank branches for the State Bank of India, ICICI, HDFC, Allahabad Bank, Central Bank and others.

Public transport
Santoshnagar is connected by buses run by TSRTC and is well connected with the rest of the city and the Hyderabad metropolitan area. Bus routes are the 102, 103, 104, 203, 253 and 478.

The nearest MMTS train stations are at Yakatpura and Malakpet respectively.

The nearest airport is Hyderabad International Airport, 19.5 km away in Shamshabad.

Colonies around Santoshnagar
Edi Bazar 
Maruthi Nagar, 
Durga Bhavani Nagar
Yadagiri Nagar
Champapet
Saidabad Colony and lab quarters.

There are also inner colonies in Santoshnagar such as:
Khalander Nagar
Mama Baqtawar Haat
Banu Nagar

Healthcare and education
Apollo DRDO, Owaisi Hospital, Srinivasa, and Nightingale are hospitals in the area.
MS Poly Clinic & Dental Care, Near Bandh Naka (ACP Office)

The Deccan College of Medical Sciences is a famous medical college present in the locality.
MVSR Engineering College is located 7 km from Santoshnagar.

Santoshnagar has many schools such as:
Iqra Islamic International School 
Preston High School
Vikas High School
The Indo English High School
Bhashyam High School
Gnanodaya High School 
Sacred Heart High School,
St. Joseph's Grammar High School
Vidya Dayini Model High School

There are educational institutions and coaching centres too, such as Student's Point Coaching Center. and Faiz E Raza Institute.

The area also has many higher education colleges such as Narayana Junior College and Srinivasa Junior College.

References

Neighbourhoods in Hyderabad, India
Municipal wards of Hyderabad, India